James Davidson (13 August 1904 – 24 November 1953) was an Australian rules footballer who played with Melbourne in the Victorian Football League (VFL).

From Walhalla originally, Davidson played junior football for Melbourne, before breaking into the senior side in 1924. He played most of his football as a rover.

Davidson was a half forward flanker in Melbourne's 1926 premiership team.

He put together 83 consecutive games from 1927 to 1931.

Davidson went to Bendigo Football League club Castlemaine, as coach, in 1933. He won the league's best and fairest award, the Fred Wood Medal that season.

References

External links

1904 births
Australian rules footballers from Victoria (Australia)
Melbourne Football Club players
Castlemaine Football Club players
1953 deaths
Melbourne Football Club Premiership players
One-time VFL/AFL Premiership players